The Sydney Sixers (WBBL) are an Australian women's Twenty20 cricket team based in Moore Park, New South Wales. They are one of two teams from Sydney to compete in the Women's Big Bash League, the other being the Sydney Thunder. Having won two championship titles and four minor premierships, the Sixers are the most successful WBBL franchise to date.

History

Formation
One of eight founding WBBL teams, the Sydney Sixers are aligned with the men's team of the same name. At the official WBBL launch on 10 July 2015, Ellyse Perry was unveiled as the Sixers' first signing. Perry would also become the team's inaugural captain. On 12 November, New South Wales Breakers assistant Ben Sawyer was announced as the Sixers' inaugural head coach.

The Sixers played their first match against the Sydney Thunder at Howell Oval in Penrith on 6 December, losing by nine wickets. It took until their seventh match, a 20 December encounter with the Perth Scorchers at the Sydney Cricket Ground, to register a win.

Rivalries

Melbourne Renegades
The Sixers and Melbourne Renegades have combined to produce some of the most "thrilling" and "controversial" matches in the league's history, particularly revolving around close finishes, including:
3 January 2018, GMHBA Stadium: In "bizarre" scenes, Sixers batter Sarah Aley attempted to score a game-tying run on the last delivery despite Renegades wicket-keeper Emma Inglis, having received the ball over the stumps from fielder Kris Britt and thus believing the match to be over, already celebrating victory. After deliberation, officiating umpires deemed the ball was not dead and the run would be allowed, thereby forcing a super over which the Renegades nevertheless went on to win.
19 January 2019, Drummoyne Oval: In the Renegades' first finals appearance, with three runs required off the last ball for an upset victory, Sophie Molineux was short of her ground attempting the winning run due to a "miracle" piece of team fielding by Sixers players Erin Burns, Sarah Aley and Alyssa Healy. In the resulting super over, Sixers captain Ellyse Perry hit a six off Molly Strano to eliminate the Renegades from the tournament. The match, in conjunction with the other semi-final played earlier in the day, was hailed as "the irrefutable rise of women's cricket" and "sport with drama, skill and unpredictability – a potent recipe for success".
17 November 2019, Drummoyne Oval: The Renegades, requiring 28 runs off the last 12 balls with only three wickets in hand, pulled off a "great escape" victory against the Sixers through a last-ball six from Courtney Webb against the bowling of Marizanne Kapp. It marked the first time a WBBL team had won a match when needing more than four runs off the final legal delivery. The ramifications of the result were season-shaping as the Renegades went on to edge out the Sixers for fourth spot on the ladder, making it the first season the Sixers would fail to qualify for finals.

Sydney Thunder 
At the WBBL|02 season launch, Sydney Thunder captain Alex Blackwell said the Sixers "desperately want to beat us and we desperately want to beat them. It's set up to be a really good rivalry." In a joint media conference ahead of WBBL|05, Sixers captain Ellyse Perry said she considers the Thunder "our biggest rivals" while the Thunder's Rachel Priest claimed "it was a really intense rivalry right when I started with the team". Noteworthy matches include:

 24 January 2016, Melbourne Cricket Ground: Having lost their first six games of the season, the Sixers stormed into the WBBL|01 final by winning nine consecutive matches. Their streak would come to an end in a low-scoring championship decider plagued by "probably the worst fielding seen all tournament" from both teams. Ultimately the Thunder scraped home by three wickets with three balls remaining to claim the inaugural Women's Big Bash title. Erin Osborne earned Player of the Final honours for her bowling figures of 3/21 off four overs.
 14 January 2017, Sydney Cricket Ground: Defending a first innings total of 138, Sixers off-spinner Lauren Smith conceded seven runs in the last over to tie the game. With scores still level after the subsequent super over, the Thunder were awarded the win on the boundary count back rule. Despite the intense rivalry between the two teams, the match was noted for a sporting gesture by Thunder captain Alex Blackwell who, suspecting she interfered with the batter, withdrew an appeal that would have led to the dismissal of the Sixers' Sara McGlashan.
 15 November 2019, Drummoyne Oval: The Sixers cruised to a comfortable 40-run victory, having also defeated the Thunder by 49 runs in the season opener—Perry top-scoring with 81 on both occasions. This marked the first time either team would sweep their fellow Sydneysiders in the regular season.

Hobart Hurricanes
The Sixers and the Hobart Hurricanes have met in two semi-finals:
 22 January 2016, Melbourne Cricket Ground: In a match initially shortened to 14 overs per side due to rain, the higher-ranked Hurricanes struggled in the first innings, managing a score of just 8/86. Further rain delays meant the Sixers' target was revised to 55 runs from eight overs, under the Duckworth–Lewis–Stern method. Sydney cruised to victory with all ten wickets in hand and ten balls remaining. Veteran off-spinner Lisa Sthalekar was named Player of the Match for her bowling figures of 3/9 from three overs.
 25 January 2017, The Gabba: Acting captain Alyssa Healy belted 77 runs off 45 balls to help the Sixers to 6/169 in the first innings. In reply, the Hurricanes were skittled for a miserly 66 runs, setting a new WBBL record for lowest all out total. The 103-run margin also set a new WBBL record for the largest victory by a team batting first.

The Sixers defeated the Hurricanes in their first eleven encounters, setting a WBBL record for the longest head-to-head winning streak. The Hurricanes finally defeated the Sixers on their twelfth attempt:
 20 November 2019, North Sydney Oval: With Ellyse Perry sidelined due to a shoulder injury, the Sixers faltered early to a score of 5/30. A resurgence, led by Marizanne Kapp's unbeaten 55 off 40 balls, helped Sydney to a total of 7/134. Hobart's chase got off to a shaky start as they found themselves down 4/22 after five overs. A healthy partnership between batters Nicola Carey and Corinne Hall came to an end in the 15th over when Hall was spectacularly caught by former Hurricanes player Erin Burns in the outfield. With 44 runs required from the final 33 deliveries, Carey went on to make 55 not out while a quickfire 29 by Chloe Tryon sealed victory for the Hurricanes with five wickets in hand and ten balls remaining. In addition to snapping their elongated head-to-head losing streak, the win set a new mark for Hobart's highest successful run chase. Belinda Vakarewa, who sliced through the Sixers' top-order, was named Player of the Match for her bowling figures of 4/19.

Perth Scorchers 
The Sixers have met, and defeated, the Perth Scorchers in two championship deciders:

 28 January 2017, WACA Ground: With captain Ellyse Perry sidelined due to a hamstring injury, the Sixers posted a modest total of 5/124 in the first innings. An unbeaten knock of 35 from 30 balls by Katherine Brunt was not enough to secure victory for the Scorchers, as the Sixers "fielded like demons and bowled dry" in a "veritable classic" to win by a narrow seven-run margin and claim their maiden title. Sarah Aley earned Player of the Final honours for her bowling figures of 4/23 off four overs.
 4 February 2018, Adelaide Oval: Electing to bat first, the Scorchers were steamrolled for 99 all out. The Sixers experienced little difficulty in the run chase, mowing down the required target with nine wickets in hand and 30 balls remaining to claim a second consecutive WBBL title. Sarah Coyte earned Player of the Final honours for her bowling figures of 3/17 off four overs.

Brisbane Heat 
The Sixers share a "growing rivalry" with the Brisbane Heat. However, ahead of WBBL|05, Sydney wicket-keeper Alyssa Healy claimed "(Brisbane) have made a bit more of it than we have in the last 12 to 18 months, it's not something we're thinking of too much." Noteworthy matches include:

 26 January 2019, Drummoyne Oval: The Heat pulled off an upset victory in the WBBL|04 final to deny a Sixers three-peat, chasing down Sydney's total of 7/131 with just three wickets in hand and four balls remaining. Beth Mooney was named Player of the Final for her innings of 65 runs off 46 deliveries. Mooney, who had been receiving on-field medical treatment for the flu and heat stroke, revealed in a post-match interview that her ongoing game delays instigated sledging from several opponents: "It was kind of nice to know while I wasn't feeling well, I was going well enough to piss them off and they were getting frustrated at how long I was taking to face up... I've played enough cricket against (the Sixers) to know what gets under their skin and we definitely won that battle."
 19 October 2019, North Sydney Oval: In their first match of the 2019–20 season, the Heat posted a total of 6/165 before bowling out the Sixers for just 73. The crushing 92-run deficit was the second-largest defeat for a chasing team in WBBL history, and also the Sixers' lowest-ever score.

Captaincy records

There have been two captains in the Sixers' history, including matches featuring an acting captain.

Source:

Season summaries

Home grounds

Players

Current squad

Australian representatives
 The following is a list of cricketers who have played for the Sixers after making their debut in the national women's team (the period they spent as both a Sixers squad member and an Australian-capped player is in brackets):

Overseas marquees

Associate rookies

Statistics and awards

Team stats
Champions: 2 – WBBL02, WBBL03
Runners-up: 3 – WBBL01, WBBL04, WBBL08
Minor premiers: 4 – WBBL|02, WBBL|03, WBBL|04, WBBL|08
 Win–loss Record:

 Highest score in an innings: 4/242 (20 overs) vs Melbourne Stars, 9 December 2017
 Highest successful chase: 5/184 (18.4 overs) vs Melbourne Stars, 22 November 2020
 Lowest successful defence: 5/124 (20 overs) vs Perth Scorchers, 28 January 2017
 Largest victory:
 Batting first: 103 runs vs Hobart Hurricanes, 25 January 2017
 Batting second: 37 balls remaining vs Hobart Hurricanes, 23 December 2017
 Longest winning streak: 9 matches (20 December 2015–22 January 2016)
 Longest losing streak: 6 matches

Source:

Individual stats
 Most runs: Ellyse Perry – 3,769
 Highest score in an innings: Ashleigh Gardner – 114 (52) vs Melbourne Stars, 9 December 2017
 Highest partnership: Ellyse Perry and Alyssa Healy – 199* vs Melbourne Stars, 3 November 2019
 Most wickets: Marizanne Kapp – 90
 Best bowling figures in an innings: Sarah Aley – 4/8 (3 overs) vs Hobart Hurricanes, 15 January 2016
 Hat-tricks taken:
 Dane van Niekerk vs Hobart Hurricanes, 17 December 2017
 Marizanne Kapp vs Melbourne Stars, 26 October 2019
 Most catches (fielder): Ellyse Perry – 48
 Most dismissals (wicket-keeper): Alyssa Healy – 93 (52 catches, 41 stumpings)

Source:

Individual awards
 Player of the Match:
 Alyssa Healy, Ellyse Perry – 19 each
 Ashleigh Gardner – 11
 Erin Burns – 5
 Sarah Aley, Marizanne Kapp, Dane van Niekerk – 4 each
 Sarah Coyte, Sara McGlashan – 2 each
 Suzie Bates, Lisa Sthalekar, Shafali Verma – 1 each
 WBBL Player of the Tournament:
Ellyse Perry – WBBL04
Ashleigh Gardner – WBBL08
 WBBL Team of the Tournament:
Ellyse Perry (5) – WBBL01, WBBL02, WBBL03, WBBL04, WBBL05
 Marizanne Kapp (4) – WBBL|01, WBBL|02, WBBL|04, WBBL|05
 Sarah Aley (2) – WBBL|02, WBBL|03
 Ashleigh Gardner (2) – WBBL|02, WBBL08
 Alyssa Healy (2) – WBBL|04, WBBL|08
 Erin Burns – WBBL|08
 Sara McGlashan – WBBL|01
 Dane van Niekerk – WBBL|03
 WBBL Young Gun Award: Ashleigh Gardner – WBBL02

Sponsors

See also

Cricket in New South Wales
Cricket NSW
Sydney Thunder (WBBL)
New South Wales Breakers

References

Notes

External links
 

 
Women's Big Bash League teams
Cricket in New South Wales
Sports teams in Sydney
Cricket clubs established in 2015
2015 establishments in Australia